Ajur  is a village in the southern state of Karnataka, India. It is located in the Athni taluk of Belgaum district in Karnataka.

See also
 Belgaum
 Districts of Karnataka

References

External links
 http://Belgaum.nic.in/

AJUR also stands for an abbreviation for

 American Journal of Undergraduate Research (http://www.ajuronline.org/), noted in the wiki article Undergraduate research journal

Villages in Belagavi district